The 2010 Redditch Borough Council election was held on 6 May 2010 to elect members of Redditch Borough Council in Worcestershire, England. A total of eleven council seats were up for election: six Conservative, four Labour and one British National Party.  The death of Conservative Cllr. Jack Field on 10 March triggered a by-election in the Crabbs Cross ward. No Liberal Democrat councillors defended seats.

Before the election the council was made up of:
 15 Conservative councillors
 10 Labour councillors
 3 Liberal Democrat councillors
 1 British National councillor

Election results

Seats up for election

Ward results

Abbey Ward

Astwood Bank & Feckenham Ward

Batchley & Brockhill Ward

Central Ward

Church Hill Ward

Crabbs Cross Ward

Greenlands Ward

Headless Cross & Oakenshaw Ward

Lodge Park Ward

Winyates Ward

References

2010
2010 English local elections
May 2010 events in the United Kingdom
2010s in Worcestershire